Imperial Records is an American record company and label started in 1947 by Lew Chudd. The label was reactivated in 2006 by EMI, which owned the label and back catalogue at the time. Imperial is owned by Universal Music Group.

Early years to 1979
When Imperial was founded in 1947, it concentrated on rhythm and blues (R&B) and country music: Fats Domino, Frankie Ford, Ricky Nelson, and Slim Whitman. In the UK, Imperial was distributed by London Records.

During the 1950s and 1960s, Imperial released jazz albums by Sonny Criss, Charlie Mariano, Papa Celestin, Erskine Hawkins, and Harold Land.

Imperial bought Aladdin in 1960 and Minit Records in 1963, having distributed Minit since 1960. During the 1950s, Imperial was one of the primary labels issuing a vast quantity of R&B from New Orleans through their involvement with producer and writer Dave Bartholomew and in the 1960s with their distribution (and purchase, a few years later) of Minit.

In 1963, after Imperial lost Fats Domino and Ricky Nelson to rival record companies, Chudd sold the label to Liberty Records.

Under Liberty's management, the label enjoyed success with Irma Thomas, Johnny Rivers, Jackie DeShannon, Classics IV, and Cher. During the British Invasion, Liberty (whose recordings were distributed by EMI in the UK) licensed the Hollies, Billy J. Kramer, the Dakotas, and the Swinging Blue Jeans from EMI. Recordings by the Bonzo Dog Band and Kim Fowley were issued in the U.S. by Imperial.

By 1970, the label had become part of Liberty's merger with United Artists Records but was phased out shortly after, with its roster transferred to United Artists. EMI acquired the Imperial Records catalogue with its acquisition of UA Records in 1979.

1990s to present
Throughout the 1990s, EMI released CD compilations of Imperial artists that featured the original Imperial labels.

In June 2006, EMI re-activated the Imperial Records imprint and announced that it would be the urban music division of Caroline Distribution, part of Virgin Records, spearheaded by the urban music veteran Neil Levine. The first signing to the imprint was Raptivism Records. Fat Joe signed with Virgin Records and Imperial Records. Imperial provided resources for developing urban artists with EMI's major labels, including Capitol Records and Virgin Records, which were merged into the Capitol Music Group in January 2007. Universal Music Group acquired the Capitol Music Group as part of its acquisition of the majority of EMI's recorded music operations in 2012. After a few releases, Imperial became dormant again.

Label variations
Early 1950s to 1954: Blue label with "IMPERIAL" in script letters at the top; 78-RPM counterparts have red labels)
1954–1955: Red label with "IMPERIAL" in script (also silver block) letters at the top
1955–1957: Maroon label with "IMPERIAL" in silver block letters at the top
1957–1963: Black label with colored rays and "IMPERIAL" in white block letters at the top; stereo album counterparts have black labels with silver lettering
1964–1966: Black, white and magenta label with I-R logo in a black box on the left side, "IMPERIAL" under the logo, and "A SUBSIDIARY OF LIBERTY RECORDS" at the bottom
1966–1969: Black and lime green label with I-R logo in a red box on the left side, "IMPERIAL" under the logo, "A PRODUCT OF LIBERTY RECORDS" under "IMPERIAL" and "A DIVISION OF LIBERTY RECORDS"
1970: Black and lime green label with I-R logo in a red box on the left side, "IMPERIAL" (in slightly larger letters than the previous label) under the logo, and "LIBERTY/UA, INC"

Imperial Records artists (1947–1970)

Doris Akers (1953) (IM-694)
Jeff Alexander
Zane Ashton (Bill Aken)
Ross Bagdasarian Sr.
Dave Bartholomew
Lee Bedford, Jr.
Elmer Bernstein
Joe Bill (DeAngelo)
The Bonzo Dog Band
James Booker
Billy Briggs
Mel Carter
Papa Celestin
Paul Chambers
Cher
Petula Clark
Classics IV
Clay Cole
Albert Collins
Kenneth Copeland
Sugar Boy Crawford
Sonny Criss
Sonny Curtis
Wild Bill Davis
Dave Dee, Dozy, Beaky, Mick & Tich
Jackie DeShannon

Fats Domino
Dukes of Dixieland
Georgie Fame
The Fantastic Baggys
Freddy Fender
The Fender IV
Ralph Flanagan
Frankie Ford
Pete Fountain
Kim Fowley
Ernie Freeman
George Girard
Bob Harrington
Peppermint Harris
Ray Harrison Orchestra
Duke Henderson
Adolph Hofner
The Hollies
The Irresistibles
Betty Kay
Billy J. Kramer & The Dakotas
Smiley Lewis
George Liberace
Bob Luman
Harley Luse and His Orchestra
The Majors
Wingy Manone
Warne Marsh
Reginald G. Marshall
 Punch Miller
The Misfits
Garnet Mimms
Bill Mooney and his Cactus Twisters
Carl Myles
Ozzie Nelson
Ricky Nelson
Sandy Nelson
The O'Jays

Don Ralke
Bo Rhambo
Johnny Rivers
Weldon Rogers
Leonard Rosenman
Santo & Johnny
Sheriff John
Dorothy Simmons (1953) (IM-693)
Huey "Piano" Smith
Johnny Spencer & The Kona Koasters (1959) (LP-9076)
The Spiders
April Stevens
The Sunshine Company
The Swinging Blue Jeans
The Teddy Bears
Irma Thomas
Al Toft and His Orchestra
T-Bone Walker
Slim Whitman
Tim Whitsett
Lester Williams
Lew Williams
Warren Zevon

Later artists
Fat Joe
MC Jin
Rasheeda
Julian Park

References

 
American record labels
Jazz record labels
Rhythm and blues record labels
Rock and roll record labels
Hip hop record labels
Record labels based in California
Companies based in Los Angeles
Universal Music Group
EMI
Record labels established in 1947
Record labels disestablished in 1970
Record labels established in 2006
1947 establishments in California
1970 disestablishments in California
2006 establishments in California
Re-established companies